KJ Joy is a music director for the Malayalam film industry. He has composed music for 71 films. He began his career as music director in 1974, after many years as recording accordion artist for various music directors, primarily his mentor MS Viswanathan, who encouraged him to try his hand as a music director after realizing his potential. His first film was Love Letter in 1975.

Selected hit songs

References

External links
 

Year of birth missing (living people)
Living people
Malayalam film score composers